Eugen Heinrich Eduad Ernst Brodhun (15 October 1860 – 19 September 1938) was a German physicist.

He developed the "Lummer-Brodhun-Würfel" (Lummer-Brodhun spectro-photometer) with Otto Lummer in 1889.

External links 
 L6 Reflection of light at kr.cs.ait.ac.th

1860 births
1938 deaths
19th-century German physicists
20th-century German physicists